The Joseph K. James House is a historic house at 83 Belmont Street in Somerville, Massachusetts.  This 3 story wood-frame house was built in  1893-4 for Joseph Knightley James, a partner in a local soap manufacturer.  It is one of Somerville's best examples of Queen Anne and Colonial Revival styling.  It has a rectangular Colonial Revival form with a pitched hip roof, with a Queen Anne turret and chimney tops.  The front porch is supported by clusters of columns and features a pedimented gable over the entry that is decorated with a hand-carved lion's head surrounded by a floral design.

The house was listed on the National Register of Historic Places in 1998.

See also
National Register of Historic Places listings in Somerville, Massachusetts

References

3.  The Somerville Journal, March 15, 1894, page 1.

Queen Anne architecture in Massachusetts
Houses on the National Register of Historic Places in Somerville, Massachusetts
Houses completed in 1893
Colonial Revival architecture in Massachusetts